The Committee for the Sveriges Riksbank Prize in Economic Sciences in Memory of Alfred Nobel is the prize committee for the Sveriges Riksbank Prize in Economic Sciences in Memory of Alfred Nobel, and fills the same role as the Nobel Committees do for the Nobel Prizes. This means that the committee is responsible for proposing laureates for the prize. The Committee for the Prize in Economic Sciences in Memory of Alfred Nobel is appointed by the Royal Swedish Academy of Sciences. It usually consists of Swedish professors of economics or related subjects who are members of the academy, although the academy in principle could appoint anyone to the committee. Two of the members of the founding committee as well as later members of the committee had also been associated with the Mont Pelerin Society.

The committee is a working body without decision power, and the final decision to award the prize is taken by the entire Royal Swedish Academy of Sciences, after having a first discussion in the academy's Class for Social Sciences.

Current

Members of the 2018 Prize Committee 

Per Strömberg, Chairman
Jakob Svensson
Tomas Sjöström
Peter Gärdenfors
Per Krusell
Eva Mörk

Secretary to the 2018 Prize Committee 

The secretary takes part in Prize Committee meetings but cannot vote (by right). Unless, however, he or she has also been appointed as a Prize Committee full member—which entails the right to vote. (On a number of occasions, individuals have held both appointments.)

 Torsten Persson

Former

Secretaries 

 , 1969–1985
 Karl-Göran Mäler, 1986–1987
 Lars E. O. Svensson, 1991–1992
 Torsten Persson, 1993–2001 
 Peter Englund, 2002––2013
 Torsten Persson, 2014–

Former members 

Bengt-Christer Ysander, 1991–1992
Lars E. O. Svensson, 1993–2002 (chairman 1999–2002)
Lennart Jörberg, (associate member 1993)
Karl Gustav Jöreskog, 1995–2001
Torsten Persson, 1995–2004 (chairman 2003–2004, also secretary)
Lars Engwall, (associate member 2003–2008)
Jakob Svensson, (associate member 2008)

References 

Nobel Memorial Prize in Economic Sciences
Royal Swedish Academy of Sciences
Awards juries and committees